Harry Billinge  (15 September 1925 – 5 April 2022) was a British soldier.

Billinge was born on 15 September 1925. He served as a sapper with the 44 Royal Engineer Commandos during the Normandy landings. After World War II, Billinge moved to Cornwall and opened a hairdressers.

Billinge was appointed MBE in the 2019 New Year Honours for services to charitable fundraising, including raising more than £25,000 towards the cost of construction of the British Normandy Memorial.

Billinge died on 5 April 2022, at the age of 96. A funeral was held at St Paul's Church in Charlestown on 26 April 2022.

References

External links 
 

1925 births
2022 deaths
Members of the Order of the British Empire
Royal Engineers soldiers
Businesspeople from Cornwall
British Army Commandos soldiers
British Army personnel of World War II
British hairdressers
Burials in Cornwall